This is a list of properties and districts listed on the National Register of Historic Places in Pennsylvania. , there are over 3,000 listed sites in Pennsylvania. All 67 counties in Pennsylvania have listings on the National Register.

Current listings by county

The following are approximate tallies of current listings in Pennsylvania on the National Register of Historic Places. These counts are based on entries in the National Register Information Database as of April 24, 2008 and new weekly listings posted since then on the National Register of Historic Places web site. There are frequent additions to the listings and occasional delistings and the counts here are not official. Also, the counts in this table exclude boundary increase and decrease listings which modify the area covered by an existing property or district and which carry a separate National Register reference number. 16 percent of the NRHP's in Pennsylvania are in Philadelphia, and nearly 40 percent are located within the Delaware Valley.

See also

List of European archaeological sites on the National Register of Historic Places in Pennsylvania
List of Native American archaeological sites on the National Register of Historic Places in Pennsylvania
List of bridges on the National Register of Historic Places in Pennsylvania (excluding covered bridges)
List of covered bridges on the National Register of Historic Places in Pennsylvania
List of National Historic Landmarks in Pennsylvania (excluding Philadelphia)
List of National Historic Landmarks in Philadelphia
List of Pennsylvania state historical markers

References

Notes

External links

National Register: Delaware and Lehigh National Heritage Corridor – travel Itinerary
National Register: Aboard the Underground Railroad
Information and photos for the numerous historic bridges in western Pennsylvania

 
Pennsylvania